Kálmán Ihász (6 March 1941 – 31 January 2019) was a Hungarian footballer.

During his club career he played for Vasas SC. For the Hungary national football team, he participated in the 1962 FIFA World Cup, the 1964 European Nations' Cup, and the 1966 FIFA World Cup. He also won a gold medal in football at the 1964 Summer Olympics.

References

Sources

External links
 
 

1941 births
2019 deaths
Footballers from Budapest
Hungarian footballers
Hungary international footballers
Olympic footballers of Hungary
Olympic gold medalists for Hungary
Olympic medalists in football
Footballers at the 1964 Summer Olympics
Medalists at the 1964 Summer Olympics
1962 FIFA World Cup players
1964 European Nations' Cup players
1966 FIFA World Cup players
Vasas SC players
Association football defenders
Hungarian people of Albanian descent